The Pierson cabinet was the cabinet of the Netherlands from 27 July 1897 until 1 August 1901. The cabinet was formed by the political party Liberal Union (CU) after the election of 1897. The centre-right cabinet was a minority government in the House of Representatives but was supported by Independent Liberals for a majority. Nicolaas Pierson of the Liberal Union was Prime Minister.

Cabinet Members

 Resigned.
 Served ad interim.

References

External links
Official

  Kabinet-Pierson Parlement & Politiek

Cabinets of the Netherlands
1897 establishments in the Netherlands
1901 disestablishments in the Netherlands
Cabinets established in 1897
Cabinets disestablished in 1901
Minority governments